Grama may refer to:

Slang for grandmother
Grama (government), a local governing body in India
Grama (halacha), a concept in Jewish law
Bouteloua, several varieties of grass

See also 
Gramma (disambiguation)